Francis Jones may refer to:

Arts
Francis Coates Jones (1857–1932), American painter
Francis Jones (historian) (1908–1993), Welsh author, archivist, historian and officer of arms
Francis R. Jones (born 1955), poetry translator and Reader in Translation Studies, Newcastle University
Francis William Doyle Jones, British sculptor

Politics
Francis Jones (American politician), U.S. Representative from Tennessee, 1817–1823
Francis Jones (Canadian politician) (1815–1887), Conservative MP of the Province of Canada and Parliament of Canada 1861–1874
Francis Jones (Lord Mayor) (1559–1622), English merchant and Lord Mayor of London, 1620

Others
Francis Jones (physicist) (1914–1988), co-developer of Oboe blind bombing system, chief scientist, AAE Farnborough
Francis Avery Jones (1910–1998), British physician and gastroenterologist

See also
Frank Jones (disambiguation)
Frances Jones (disambiguation)